The Southern Cross Astronomical Society, founded in 1922, is one of the oldest amateur astronomy societies in the Western Hemisphere.  It is located in the Physics Department of Florida International University in Miami, Florida.

This is a List of Astronomical Outreach Resources in Europe which was originally started as an initiative within the framework of the EU [FP7](https://en.m.wikipedia.org/wiki/Framework_Programmes_for_Research_and_Technological_Development) Astronet project.

See also
 List of astronomical societies

External links
Southern Cross Astronomical Society official website

Scientific societies based in the United States
1922 establishments in Florida
Florida International University